X Factor is an Italian television music competition to find new singing talent; the winner receives a € 300,000 recording contract with Sony Music. Before the start of the auditions process it was announced that Elio, Morgan and Simona Ventura would be confirmed as judges and mentors, whilst Mika has been chosen for replacing Arisa in the role; also Alessandro Cattelan returned as host. The seventh season aired on Sky Uno starting from 26 September 2013 to 12 December 2013.

Auditions for season 7 took place in Naples, Genoa and Milan in June 2013; bootcamp took place in Milan for two days, on 26 and 27 June. Unconfirmed rumors revealed that Elio will mentor the Over-25s, Morgan the boys, Mika the girls and Ventura the groups; they selected their final three acts during judges' houses.

Michele Bravi, a member of the category Boys and mentored by Morgan, was announced the winner of the competition on 12 December 2013. His winner's single, "La vita e la felicità", released immediately after the end of the show, was co-written by Italian singer-songwriter Tiziano Ferro.

Judges, presenters and other personnel

During the sixth Live Show of the season, Arisa complained about voting mechanism, and tossed allegations against Simona Ventura, accusing her of being «phony» in judging her acts. In February 2013, Sky Movies and Entertainment vice-president Andrea Scrosati announced in an interview to Corriere della Sera that Arisa would not be confirmed as a mentor. At first, even Morgan and Elio seemed intended to leave the show; newspapers and websites cited Malika Ayane, Lorella Cuccarini and Gigi D'Alessio as possible replacements. On 23 April it was announced that Mika would be the first non-Italian mentor in the competition history; finally, on 12 and 19 May the presences of Morgan and Elio were confirmed.

Alessandro Cattelan has been confirmed to present the main show on Sky Uno HD in February 2013. Also vocal coaches Alberto Tafuri, Paola Folli and Gaetano Cappa, music-director Lucio Fabbri and art-director and choreographer Luca Tomassini were confirmed, whilst Mika chose Rossana Casale as the fourth vocal coach.

Applications and auditions

A preliminary phase of auditions was held:
at Castel Sant'Elmo, Naples, from 12 to 14 May 2013;
at Unicredit Tower, Milan, from 25 to 27 May 2013.

The judges auditions was held:
at 105 Stadium, Genoa, on 1 and 2 June 2013;
at Teatro Dal Verme, Milan, from 17 to 19 June 2013.

On 18 June auditions Fedez starred as guest-judge.

Bootcamp
Bootcamp took place at Mediolanum Forum, Assago, over two days, on Wednesday 26 and Thursday 27 June.

Judges' houses
"Home visits" was broadcast on 17 October. Morgan mentored the Boys at E-Werk, Berlin, assisted by Asia Argento; Mika took the Girls at Slane Castle, Republic of Ireland, assisted by Marco Mengoni; Elio auditioned the Over 25s at Museo del Violino, Cremona, with Linus, and Ventura tested the Groups at Officine Grandi Riparazioni, Turin with Davide Dileo.

The twelve eliminated acts were:
Boys: Andrea Butturini, Marco Colonna, Alberto Galuppini
Girls: Chiara Grispo, Valentina Livi, Roberta Pompa
25+: Valeria Crescenzi, Sebastiano Di Santo, Adriana Salvadori
Groups: Dynamo, Extra, Mr. Rain & Osso

In the second live show, the eliminated act of the home visits, Roberta Pompa was brought back, after a final showdown with Mr. Rain & Osso.

Contestants and categories

Key:
 – Winner
 – Runner-up
 – Third place

Live shows

Results summary
The number of votes received by each act were released by Sky Italia after the final.

Colour key

Live show details

Week 1 (24 October 2013)
Group performance: "Qualcosa che non c'è" (with Elisa)
Celebrity performers: Chiara ("The Final Countdown"/"Il futuro che sarà"/"Purple Rain"/"L'esperienza dell'amore"/"Distratto"), Francesca Michielin ("Cigno nero"/"Due respiri"), Elisa ("L'anima vola") and Icona Pop ("I Love It")

Judges' votes to eliminate
 Ventura: Lorenzo Iuracà – backed her own act, FreeBoys.
 Morgan: FreeBoys – backed his own act, Lorenzo Iuracà.
 Mika: Lorenzo Iuracà – considered it appropriate to continue the project of an Italian boyband.
 Elio: Lorenzo Iuracà – having revealed the difficulties in approaching the songwriting.

Week 2 (31 October 2013)
Group performance: "Walk on the Wild Side"
Celebrity performers: Ellie Goulding ("Burn")

Judges' votes to eliminate
 Elio: FreeBoys – backed his own act, Fabio Santini.
 Ventura: Fabio Santini – backed her own act, FreeBoys.
 Mika: FreeBoys – wanted to give Santini another chance.
 Morgan: Fabio Santini – could not decide so chose to take it to deadlock.

With both acts receiving two votes each, the result went to deadlock and a new public vote commenced for 200 seconds. FreeBoys were eliminated as the act with the fewest public votes.

Week 3 (7 November 2013)
Theme: Songs from the 1990s
Celebrity performers: John Newman ("Love Me Again"), Mika and Chiara ("Stardust")

Judges' votes to eliminate
 Elio: Alan Scaffardi – considered Aba the best singer in the competition
 Morgan: Alan Scaffardi – found Aba's performances more convincing.
 Mika: Aba – appreciated Scaffardi's passion.
 Ventura: Alan Scaffardi – considered Aba had an untapped potential.

Week 4 (14 November 2013)
Theme: Hell Factor (double elimination)
Group performance: "The Passenger"
Celebrity performers: Luca Carboni and Tiziano Ferro ("Persone silenziose"), Tom Odell ("Another Love")

Judges' votes to eliminate (Part 1)
 Mika: Fabio Santini – backed his own act, Roberta Pompa.
 Elio: Roberta Pompa – backed his own act, Fabio Santini.
 Morgan: Roberta Pompa – thought that Santini could have more chances in the music business.
 Ventura: Roberta Pompa – considered Santini particularly original.

Judges' votes to eliminate (Part 2)
 Mika: Street Clerks – backed his own act, Gaia Galizia.
 Ventura: Gaia Galizia – backed her own act, Street Clerks.
 Elio: Street Clerks – considered Galizia particularly interesting.
 Morgan: Gaia Galizia – could not decide so chose to take it to deadlock.

With both acts receiving two votes each, the result went to deadlock and reverted to the earlier public vote. Street Clerks were eliminated as the act with the fewest public votes.

Week 5 (21 November 2013)
Theme: Hell Factor (double elimination)
Group performance: "It Don't Mean a Thing (If It Ain't Got That Swing)" (with Matthew Morrison)
Celebrity performers: Fedez ("Nuvole di fango"/"Cigno nero"/"Alfonso Signorini (eroe nazionale)") and Editors ("A Ton of Love")

Judges' votes to eliminate
 Elio: Gaia Galizia – backed his own act, Fabio Santini.
 Mika: Fabio Santini – backed his own act, Gaia Galizia.
 Morgan: Fabio Santini – found Galizia's performances more convincent.
 Ventura: Fabio Santini – considered Galizia more deserving of staying in the competition.

Week 6: Quarter-final (28 November 2013)
Theme: Dance performance (Round 1); Mentor's Choice (Round 2)
Group performance: "Beautiful Day"/"Bicycle Race" (with Elio e le Storie Tese)
Celebrity performers: Marco Mengoni ("Non passerai"/"Pronto a correre"/"L'essenziale") and Olly Murs ("Hand on Heart")

Judges' votes to eliminate
 Mika: Ape Escape – backed his own act, Gaia Galizia.
 Ventura: Gaia Galizia – backed her own act, Ape Escape.
 Elio: Gaia Galizia – stated that he had preferred Ape Escape.
 Morgan: Ape Escape – considered Galizia more interesting for the music business.

With both acts receiving two votes each, the result went to deadlock and reverted to the earlier public vote. Gaia Galizia was eliminated as the act with the fewest public votes.

Week 7: Semi-final (5 December 2013)
Theme: Previously unreleased songs (Round 1); Mentor's Choice (Round 2)
Group performance: "Spirito e virtù" (with Morgan)
Celebrity performers: Katy Perry ("Unconditionally")

Judges' votes to eliminate
 Morgan: Aba – backed his own act, Andrea D'Alessio.
 Elio: Andrea D'Alessio – backed his own act, Aba.
 Ventura: Aba – considered D'Alessio more original.
 Mika: Andrea D'Alessio – could not decide so chose to take it to deadlock.

With both acts receiving two votes each, the result went to deadlock and reverted to the earlier public vote. Andrea D'Alessio was eliminated as the act with the fewest public votes.

Week 8: Final (12 December 2013)
Theme: Celebrity duets (Round 1); Previously unreleased songs (Round 2); "My song" (own choice, Round 3)
Group performance: "Man in the Mirror" (all X Factor acts with Mario Biondi, Elisa, Giorgia and Marco Mengoni)
Celebrity performers: Giorgia ("Quando una stella muore"), Mika and Morgan ("Altrove"/"Relax, Take It Easy"/"Altre forme di vita"/"We Are Golden"), One Direction ("Story of My Life"), Elisa ("Ecco che")

References

External links
 X Factor Italia

2013 Italian television seasons
Italian music television series
Italy 07
X Factor (Italian TV series)